Funk Flex Full Throttle is an American television series that premiered May 2, 2010, on MTV2 and ended on June 26, 2011. The series hosted by Funkmaster Flex, finds hip hop artists showcasing their car collections, as well as the customization projects ongoing at Flex's New York garage.

Episodes

Season 1 (2010)

Season 2 (2011)

References

MTV2 original programming
Automotive television series
English-language television shows
2010 American television series debuts
2011 American television series endings